Eduard von Mayer (1873–1960) was a German novelist and philosopher who, with Elisar von Kupffer, founded The Elisarion Community, a religious community, at Minusio, Switzerland, in 1926.

Early life
Eduard von Mayer was born in 1873 in Analowo, near Saint Petersburg, the son of Charlotte von Mayer and Dr. Karl von Mayer, a physician and founder of the protestant hospital of Saint Petersburg. One of his older sisters was the author Sonia E. Howe. He also had an older sister, Jenny de Mayer, who was a Sister of the Russian Red Cross and Protestant missionary, as well as a sister, Dr. Charlotte Olivier (1864-1945), who specialized in the treatment of tuberculosis.

He was educated by theologians. As a child he could speak German, Russian and other foreign languages.

At 13 von Mayer fell in love with Elisabeth von Stackelberg, but the love was unrequited. By the age of 17 he was suicidal and developed a dislike of Christianity. In the summer of 1891 he met Elisàr von Kupffer. The meeting pushed von Mayer to pursue his interests in theatre and fine arts against his family wishes.
 

In 1894 von Mayer moved with his family to Lake Geneva and he continued his studies in Switzerland. This was also the time when his relationship with Elisabeth von Stackelberg ended and he tried to commit suicide.

In 1897 he graduated at Halle an der Saale with a dissertation on Schopenhauer's aesthetics. From 1897 onwards, his life coincided almost completely with that of von Kupffer. The authorship of the essay on Clarism such as "Was soll uns der Klarismus — eine menschliche und soziale Neugeburt" (What Can Clarism Give Us — A Human and Social Rebirth) and "Ein neuer Flug und eine heilige Burg" (A New Flight and a Holy Castle) is probably to assign to both von Kupffer and von Mayer.

In 1902 von Mayer published "Falsche Feuer" (False Fires), a critical approach towards German-Protestant Saint Petersburg, which had almost caused a break-up with his family.

Von Mayer published art historical works, like "Pompeji in seiner Kunst" (Pompeii as an Art City) and "Fürsten und Künstler — Zur Soziologie der Kunst in Berlin" (Rulers and Artists — The Sociology of Art in Berlin), both published in 1904.
 
Eduard von Mayer was the one behind the publicity effort for promoting the Clarism in renowned newspapers and magazines; he also gave lectures and showed slides.

After von Kupffer's death in 1942, von Mayer devoted his time in documenting and securing their communal achievements. He catalogue more or less 2400 items: letters, sketches, drawings, plans, and paintings. He did also a "purging" of the homosexual aspect of his relationship with the other man: intimate correspondences between the two men, documented evidences of his contact with Magnus Hirschfeld, traces of the men's collaboration with "Der Eigene" (The Queer One or The Individualist), the first magazine for homosexuals; contributions in Hirschfeld's "Jahrbuch der sexuellen Zwischenstufen" (Yearbook of Sexual Inter-stages); even proofs for the authorship of "Das Mysterium der Geschlechter" (The Mystery of The Sexes), a Claristic theory of the sexes.

References

1873 births
1960 deaths
20th-century German writers